The 2018–19 season was 7th season in the top Ukrainian football league for FC Oleksandriya. Oleksandriya competed in Premier League, Ukrainian Cup.

Players

Squad information

Transfers

In

Out

Pre-season and friendlies

Competitions

Overall

Premier League

League table

Results summary

Results by round

Matches

Ukrainian Cup

Statistics

Appearances and goals

|-
! colspan=16 style=background:#dcdcdc; text-align:center| Goalkeepers

|-
! colspan=16 style=background:#dcdcdc; text-align:center| Defenders

|-
! colspan=16 style=background:#dcdcdc; text-align:center| Midfielders 

|-
! colspan=16 style=background:#dcdcdc; text-align:center| Forwards

|-
! colspan=16 style=background:#dcdcdc; text-align:center| Players transferred out during the season

 
Last updated: 31 May 2019

Goalscorers

Last updated: 26 May 2019

Clean sheets

Last updated: 31 May 2019

Disciplinary record

Last updated: 31 May 2019

References

External links
 Official website

FC Oleksandriya
Oleksandriya